A money mule, sometimes called a "smurfer", is a person who transfers money acquired illegally (e.g., stolen) in person, through a courier service, or electronically, on behalf of others. Typically, the mule is paid for services with a small part of the money transferred. Money mules are often dupes recruited on-line for what they think is legitimate employment, not aware that the money they are transferring is the product of crime. The money is transferred from the mule's account to the scam operator, typically in another country. Similar techniques are used to transfer illegal merchandise.

Details
Commonly, mules are recruited with job advertisements for "payment processing agents", "money transfer agents", "local processors", and other similar titles; the real benefit to the criminals is not the work carried out by the mule, but that the criminals are distanced from the risky, visible transfer. Some money mules are recruited by an attractive member of the opposite sex. After deducting a relatively small payment for themselves, candidates are asked to accept funds and to forward them to a third party, via remote work. Legitimate companies use escrow services for this kind of work. Mules recruited online are typically used to transfer the proceeds from online fraud, such as phishing scams, malware scams or scams that operate around auction sites like eBay.

After money or merchandise has been stolen, the criminal employs a mule to transfer the money or goods, hiding the criminal's true identity and location from the victim of the crime and the authorities.
By using instant payment mechanisms such as Western Union, the mule allows the thief to transform a reversible and traceable transaction into an irreversible and untraceable one.

If an innocent third party's bank details have been compromised, they can be used as a mule without their knowledge, something sometimes called "Cuckoo smurfing".

Criminals trading in stolen or illegally acquired goods use similar tactics to recruit mules who receive packages and forward them to mail drops not traceable to the criminal.

Bitcoin ATMs were reported by Brian Krebs in 2016 to be rising in popularity for money muling.

Penalties
Money mules are complicit and risk criminal prosecution and long jail sentences.

Cases
In 2010, The FBI Cyber Crimes Task Force, composed of Federal, State, and Local law enforcement, charged more than 37 defendants involved in a highly organized money mule scheme, facilitated by the Zeus Financial Trojan. This group of money mules opened several bank accounts, using both real and fake identification, to receive stolen funds from compromised bank accounts, withdraw the stolen money, then wire the stolen funds overseas.  These money mules facilitated the theft of over $3 million from victim bank accounts.

See also
 Advance-fee scam
 Money laundering
 Mule (smuggling)
 Parcel mule scam
 Strawperson

References

Further reading
 

Illegal occupations
Fraud
Money laundering